Pseudentephria is a genus of moths in the family Geometridae described by Viidalepp in 1976.

References

Larentiini